Spirotropis genilda is a species of sea snail, a marine gastropod mollusk in the family Drilliidae.

Description
The length of the shell attains 10.5 mm, its diameter 4.6 mm.

(Original description) The small, white shell contains about six whorls exclusive of the (lost) protoconch. The suture is distinct, the whorl in front of it slightly turgid, in front of which the anal fasciole is more or less constricted. At the shoulder begin about fifteen short, very obliquely protractive, wave-like ribs, with narrower interspaces, which are conspicuous only near the periphery. The surface is otherwise smooth except for faint incremental lines. The aperture is lunate. The anal sulcus is wide and shallow. The outer lip is sharp, thin and arcuately produced in front of the sulcus. The body is polished. The columella is short, gyrate, not pervious and obliquely truncate in front. The siphonal canal is very short, wide, and slightly recurved. There is no operculum on the holotype.

Distribution
This species occurs in the demersal zone of the Gulf of Panama at a depth of 2300 m.

References

  Tucker, J.K. 2004 Catalog of recent and fossil turrids (Mollusca: Gastropoda). Zootaxa 682:1–1295

External links

genilda
Gastropods described in 1908